The list of ship launches in 1910 includes a chronological list of some ships launched in 1910.


References

1910
Ship launches